Niklas Gunnarsson (born 27 April 1991) is a Norwegian footballer, who plays as a defender for Strømsgodset. Gunnarsson has previously played for Odd, Swedish clubs Elfsborg and Djurgårdens IF, Scottish club Hibernian, Italian club Palermo, Norwegian club Vålerenga and Sarpsborg 08.

He is the son of former football manager Ronny Geson Gunnarsson. He is known for his trademark long throw-ins, good crossing ability and offensive play.

Career
Gunnarsson made his senior debut on 25 March 2012 against Sogndal, they lost the game 0–4.

His contract with Odd expired after the 2013 season, and in October 2013 he signed a three-year contract with Vålerenga and joined the club in January 2014.

Gunnarsson was Vålerengas first choice right back during the 2014 season, starting 29 out of 30 matches in the Norwegian Premier League. Gunnarsson fell out of the team in the following season, after coach Kjetil Rekdal made several changes after a poor display from the team in the Norwegian Football Cup. Gunnarsson later left for Swedish side IF Elfsborg on a loan, a move that left several of Vålerengas fans dismayed after his several good performances in the previous season.

In Sweden Gunnarsson played 11 matches in the Allsvenskan, scoring one goal and assisting another.
"Niklas is an extremely professional player both on and off the pitch and he has done a great job for Elfsborg in his time here. He has been held in high esteem by his team mates and I would like to give him the best recommendations and wish him the best of luck in the future"' – Elfsborg head coach Magnus Haglund speaking about Gunnarsson leaving the club.

On 5 January 2016, he joined Scottish Championship side Hibernian on loan until the end of the 2015–16 season. He made his debut on 9 January in a Scottish Cup fourth round 2–0 win against Raith Rovers. His first goal for the club was the third goal in a 3–2 win against Rangers on 20 April. Gunnarsson also recorded a goal against Queen of the South on 1 May. He appeared as a substitute when Hibs won the Scottish Cup for the first time since 1902 in the 2016 Scottish Cup Final.

On 9 August 2016, he joined Allsvenskan side Djurgårdens IF on a -year deal. He was given number 28. Ahead of 2017 Gunnarsson had his shirt number changed from 28 to 5. On 10 May 2018 he played as Djurgarden beat Malmö FF 3-0 in the Swedish Cup Final.

On 1 March 2019, Gunnarsson signed a 1.5-year contract with Italian club Palermo. Following Palermo's exclusion from the Serie B, he was released together with all other players, without making any single appearances during his short stay at the club.

On 2 September 2019, Gunnarsson joined Sarpsborg 08 on a contract until the end of the 2019 season.

International career
Gunnarsson received his first international call-up from the Norway national football team for friendlies against Portugal and Belgium in May 2016, coming on as a substitute in the 86th minute against Portugal.

Career statistics

Honours 

Hibernian
Scottish Cup: 2015–16

Djurgårdens IF
 Svenska Cupen: 2017–18

References

External links
 

1991 births
Living people
Sportspeople from Porsgrunn
Sportspeople from Tønsberg
Norwegian footballers
Association football defenders
Pors Grenland players
Walsall F.C. players
Odds BK players
Vålerenga Fotball players
Sarpsborg 08 FF players
Strømsgodset Toppfotball players
Eliteserien players
Norwegian expatriate sportspeople in England
Hibernian F.C. players
Norwegian expatriate sportspeople in Sweden
IF Elfsborg players
Palermo F.C. players
Norwegian expatriate sportspeople in Scotland
Norwegian expatriate footballers
Expatriate footballers in England
Expatriate footballers in Sweden
Expatriate footballers in Scotland
Expatriate footballers in Italy
Allsvenskan players
Norway international footballers
Djurgårdens IF Fotboll players
Scottish Professional Football League players